TubaChristmas is a music concert held in cities worldwide that celebrates those who play, teach, and compose music for instruments in the tuba family, including the tuba, sousaphone, baritone, and euphonium, though some participants bring rarer members of the family such as the helicon, ophicleide, serpent and double bell euphonium.

The first TubaChristmas was organized by Harvey G. Phillips to honor his tuba teacher William Bell,  born on Christmas Day 1902. It was held December 22, 1974, in the ice skating rink at New York City's Rockefeller Center; Paul Lavalle conducted. Over 300 musicians played that day, beginning a holiday tradition. The arrangements of the Christmas carols were written by Alec Wilder, who coincidentally died on Christmas Eve 1980.

It was not easy to convince Rockefeller Center to let hundreds of tubas play on the ice rink. Phillips had to provide the unlisted telephone numbers of some of his friends: Leopold Stokowski, Leonard Bernstein, Andre Kostelanetz, and Morton Gould. He was given free rein after his references were checked.

TubaChristmas concerts vary in size from a quartet (two euphoniums and two tubas), to several hundred at their largest events. Musicians can play in a TubaChristmas concert by playing an instrument in the tuba family (conical bore). There is a nominal participant registration fee.

The TubaChristmas version of "Jingle Bells", arranged by Norlan Bewley, incorporates the trio section of the "National Emblem" march by Edwin Eugene Bagley before returning to the "Jingle Bells" melody.

TubaChristmas coordinators in New York City include Michael Salzman, one of Harvey Phillips' former students at Indiana University. Salzman is the tuba and euphonium professor at Hofstra University.

References

External links
 
 Merry TubaChristmas, Kennedy Center

Brass instrument organizations
Christmas music
Concerts
Tubas
1974 establishments in New York City
Recurring events established in 1974